Marco Melandri (born 7 August 1982) is an Italian retired motorcycle road racer who is a five-time premier class race winner. He is the 2002 250 cc World Champion and runner-up in 125 cc, MotoGP and Superbike World Championship. He competed in the MotoGP class from 2003 to 2010 and then a brief return with Aprilia in 2015.

The  season is regarded as his best ever as he won three races and finished 24 points behind eventual champion Nicky Hayden. In both these seasons he won more races than title rival Hayden, finishing ahead of Hayden in 2005 and just behind him in 2006. Melandri has 22 race wins in Grand Prix motorcycle racing including five in MotoGP.

Melandri switched to the Superbike World Championship in 2011, earning 22 wins in his first six seasons finishing among the top five every time. Melandri retired from racing after the 2019 Superbike World Championship. After a brief return to Superbike in 2020 and racing in four rounds Melandri retired again.

Career

Early career
Melandri was born in Ravenna.  He was introduced to racing by a former rider Loris Reggiani at the age of six. He came through the ranks from minibikes, motocross and then the Italian and European 125cc championship.

In 1997, Melandri won the Italian 125cc championship, also finishing 4th in European 125cc championship. In addition to his European success, he made his debut in 125cc world championship at Brno, Czech Republic as a wild card rider.

125cc World Championship
After impressing in Italian and European championship in 1997, Melandri finally got his chance to compete in 1998 125cc world championship as a regular. He rode Honda 125cc bike under Benetton Honda Team. He went on to impress many as he earned his first podium in the fourth race of the season, where he finished second in his home Grand Prix at Mugello, Italy. His brilliant debut season continued when he won his first grand prix at Assen TT, Netherlands. He won this race at the age of 15 years and 324 days which made him the youngest ever Grand Prix winner, at the time. Overall, he won two Grand Prix in his debut season and therefore he finished the season at 3rd position in overall standings behind champion Kazuto Sakata and runner-up Tomomi Manako.

He remained on the same bike and team in 1999, where he bid to win the 125cc world championship. He went on to win 5 Grand Prix but failed to win the championship, finishing second behind Emilio Alzamora with just a single point difference. Failure in securing his first world championship did not stop his rise to 250cc world championship in 2000.

250cc World Championship
Melandri was signed by Aprilia in 2000 to replace another Italian Valentino Rossi who left the team and 250cc class for 500cc class. He was highly expected to take over Rossi's shoes and to win the 250cc world championship. However, his debut season did not start as well as the expectation. He struggled to adapt to bigger bike and higher competition. He failed to win any Grand Prix in 2000, managing only 4 podiums, all came late in the season. Despite these problems, he still finishes the season at 5th position overall.

In 2001, his performances were improving. He managed to win his first 250cc Grand Prix at Sachsenring, Germany. However, it was his only win in 2001. Despite managing to appear on the podium on 9 occasions, he never really challenged for the championship. He finished the season in 3rd position behind champion Daijiro Kato and runner-up Tetsuya Harada.

2002 proved to be Melandri's chance to shine. With 2001 champion and runner-up, Kato and Harada moved to MotoGP class, he became the strongest contender for the championship. He dominated the season by collecting 9 wins and 3 additional podiums. After challenging for world championship for years, he finally won the 250cc world title. He became the youngest 250cc world champion at the age of 20 years and 74 days until Dani Pedrosa broke his record in 2004.

MotoGP World Championship
After securing the 250cc world title in 2002, Melandri moved up to MotoGP class to spearhead Yamaha factory team alongside Carlos Checa in 2003 replacing the departing Max Biaggi. The Yamaha was less competitive than Honda and Ducati, and although Melandri at times showed good speed, he struggled to turn this into good results. He finished the season in fifteenth position without collecting any wins or podiums.

He joined Yamaha's satellite team, Tech3 in 2004 alongside Norick Abe in order to make way for the incoming Valentino Rossi. This season, he again struggled to get top results. Although he managed to collect two consecutive podiums, a series of crashes and retirements kept him out of the top 10 in overall standings. He finished the season in twelfth position.

Released from his Yamaha contract after the 2004 season, Melandri was the surprise choice of boss Fausto Gresini to join Sete Gibernau in the Movistar Honda team for the 2005 MotoGP campaign. Melandri was successful with Movistar Honda in 2005, with a consistent run of podium finishes early in the season, ultimately taking his first two wins in the final two races of 2005 to clinch second place in the championship. In doing so, he was the first Honda rider to win back-to-back races for nearly two years, winning the final two rounds of the MotoGP Championship at Istanbul and in Valencia.  Although he never really challenged his best friend Valentino Rossi for the title, he finished the season strongly as runner-up, with a total of two wins and five other podiums.

Melandri rode for Gresini's Fortuna Honda team alongside Toni Elías in the 2006 season. With Rossi struggling to find consistency, he was a major challenger, along with Ducati's Loris Capirossi and Honda riders Nicky Hayden and Dani Pedrosa. He again won at Istanbul, despite starting from fourteenth on the grid. He managed further wins at Le Mans, France and Phillip Island, Australia.  He finished the season in fourth position, just one point behind Capirossi.

In 2007, Melandri and Elias remained in the Honda Gresini team, now sponsored by Hannspree. Honda's 800cc machine was not competitive. Melandri finished on the podium at Mazda Raceway Laguna Seca and Le Mans –  at this point he and works rider Dani Pedrosa were the only Honda riders with multiple podiums. He ultimately finished fifth overall, second only to Pedrosa among the Honda riders.

Immediately after Melandri's 3rd-place finish in the 2007 USA's MotoGP round, Ducati announced that he would join its factory team alongside Casey Stoner for 2008 and 2009. But 2008 proved disastrous, with a run of uncompetitive runs often leaving him behind the semi-works Alice Team bikes of Toni Elías and Sylvain Guintoli. At Assen he qualified last and ran there throughout. A rumoured mid-season move to Kawasaki did not occur, however Melandri announced that he would be joining Kawasaki Racing Team for the 2009 MotoGP season to ride alongside his new teammate John Hopkins on 19 August. He then ended the season in a lacklustre 17th position.

Kawasaki pulled its factory involvement for 2009, leading to fears that Melandri would not have a ride, however a rescue package was agreed to allow Melandri to run the bike for a one-bike semi-works Hayate Racing team, despite his concerns over the bike's poor rear traction. In 2009 Melandri achieved his first podium since 2007 with his 2nd-place finish at the wet French motorcycle Grand Prix. His only other top six finishes were in the first three races, as the team tailed off bike development and Melandri finished tenth overall. At Brno he battled Mika Kallio for sixth before a penultimate-lap collision between the two.

For 2010, Melandri returned to Gresini Honda, with a factory-spec RC212V bike from the start. Full factory support had sometimes been promised, but not provided, during his first Gresini spell. The team made set-up errors in its initial testing.

Superbike World Championship
Melandri moved to the Superbike World Championship from 2011 with the Yamaha World Superbike Team, replacing Cal Crutchlow, who moved to the Tech3 team in MotoGP.

On 2 October 2011, Melandri signed a contract to ride with the BMW World Superbike team for the 2012 season, after Yamaha elected not to continue with a factory team after the 2011 season. Melandri achieved BMW's best result, at the time, in the Superbike World Championship, with a second place in the season-opening race at Phillip Island, having started 13th on the grid. Mixed results followed at Imola, Assen and Monza, but Melandri achieved BMW's first Superbike World Championship victory at the European round at Donington Park, leading home teammate Leon Haslam in a 1–2 finish. Melandri and Haslam collided in the meeting's second race, denying a weekend sweep for BMW. From that point, Melandri won races at Miller Motorsports Park, Motorland Aragón and a double at Brno, to move within 21 points of the championship lead held by Max Biaggi.

On 16 July 2020, it was announced that Melandri would replace Leon Camier at the Barni Ducati Racing Team for the remainder of the season 2020. Camier was not recovered from a shoulder injury during winter testing at Motorland Aragon after fracturing his shoulder and wrist.

In September 2020, another retirement announcement was made midway through the season, due to Melandri's disappointing results and the hope of the Barni team finding better WSBK success with their younger rider Samuele Cavalieri, promoted from their entry in the Italian national CIV Superstock race class.

Return to MotoGP
In November 2014, it was announced that Melandri would return to Gresini, Aprilia's factory team for the 2015 season. However, after failing to score a point in the first eight races of the season, Melandri left the team and was replaced by Michael Laverty and then by Stefan Bradl.

Car racing
In addition to his motorcycle racing career, Melandri has also competed in car racing.  He raced in two rounds of the 2008-09 Speedcar Series season, scoring two points from the four races.

Career statistics

Grand Prix motorcycle racing

By season

By class

Races by year
(key) (Races in bold indicate pole position, races in italics indicate fastest lap)

Superbike World Championship

By season

Races by year
(key) (Races in bold indicate pole position; races in italics indicate fastest lap)

References

External links
 

1982 births
Living people
Sportspeople from Ravenna
Italian motorcycle racers
Italian racing drivers
Yamaha Motor Racing MotoGP riders
Ducati Corse MotoGP riders
250cc World Championship riders
125cc World Championship riders
Speedcar Series drivers
Superbike World Championship riders
Tech3 MotoGP riders
Gresini Racing MotoGP riders
MotoGP World Championship riders
250cc World Riders' Champions